The 2011 Nigerian Senate election in Edo State was held on April 9, 2011, to elect members of the Nigerian Senate to represent Edo State. Domingo Alaba Obende representing Edo North and Ehigie Edobor Uzamere representing Edo South won on the platform of Action Congress of Nigeria, while Odion Ugbesia representing Edo Central on the platform of Peoples Democratic Party.

Overview

Summary

Results

Edo North 
Action Congress of Nigeria candidate Domingo Alaba Obende won the election, defeating other party candidates.

Edo South 
Action Congress of Nigeria candidate Ehigie Edobor Uzamere won the election, defeating other party candidates.

Edo Central 
Peoples Democratic Party candidate Odion Ugbesia won the election, defeating party candidates.

References 

Edo State Senate elections
Edo State senatorial elections
Edo State senatorial elections